Amui (also Romanized as ‘Amū’ī) is a village in Shapur Rural District, in the Central District of Kazerun County, Fars Province, Iran. At the 2006 census, its population was 763, in 160 families.

References 

Populated places in Kazerun County